John Arne Semundseth Riise (born 24 September 1980) is a Norwegian professional football manager and former player who played as a left back and a left midfielder. He is currently the manager of Toppserien club Avaldsnes.

With 110 caps, Riise is the most capped player for the Norway national team. He was named in the Norway squad for UEFA Euro 2000 but did not play in the tournament. Riise scored 16 goals before his retirement from international duty in 2013. He spent seven years playing for Premier League side Liverpool, in which he won many honours, including the 2004–05 UEFA Champions League, before moving to Roma in 2008.

Club career

Early career
Riise began his career in his homeland with Aalesund. After a single season as a senior player for the club, he moved abroad in 1998, playing the formative years of his professional career with French club Monaco. When Aalesund opened their new stadium in April 2005, businessman Olav Nils Sunde donated a statue to the club, which was erected in front of the stadium. While Sunde denied it, the statue bore a very strong resemblance to Riise. In 2007, when Riise played in the Champions League Final, a Norwegian commentator demanded the statue officially carry his name. Riise himself has said, "[The name change] is not for me to decide. Everyone sees who it is, and I know that it was made for me."

Riise was a regular member of the 1999–2000 Ligue 1 championship-winning side, however, he fell out of favour with coach Claude Puel after admitting his desire to leave. Riise was a subject of interest from Premier League clubs, especially Fulham and Leeds United that both offered £4 million bids in 2000, though both came to nothing as Monaco wanted £6 million for him.

He was then sold to Liverpool for £4 million the following summer.

Liverpool

He made his debut for Liverpool on 24 August 2001 2001 UEFA Super Cup game against Bayern Munich played at the Stade Louis II. He scored as Liverpool went on to win the game 3–2. He also scored important goals throughout the Premier League season against teams such as Arsenal, Everton, Newcastle United and Manchester United. Riise initially wore the number 18 shirt but changed to the number 6 shirt in 2004–05 season, which had been vacated by defender Markus Babbel. He scored 8 goals in his first season with Liverpool.

Riise endured what were considered below-average seasons by most in the 2002–03 and 2003–04 seasons, but he rediscovered his form in 2004–05 following the appointment of Rafael Benítez as manager. He won a UEFA Champions League winner's medal, providing the assist for Liverpool's first goal of the final, although his attempt in the penalty shoot-out against Milan was saved. In the 2005 Football League Cup Final, he scored 45 seconds into the game, the fastest goal in the fixture history, according to the official Liverpool homepage; however, Chelsea eventually prevailed 3–2 after extra time.

In January 2006, Riise signed a new contract at Anfield to keep him at the club until 2009. In February 2008, Riise announced his desire to stay at Liverpool for the rest of his career.

Riise helped the club to win the 2005–06 FA Cup, scoring in the semi-final against Chelsea and successfully converting his attempt in the penalty shoot-out against West Ham in the final.

After a poor run of form in Liverpool's away games in the autumn of 2006, Riise reacted to comments made by teammates Pepe Reina and Jamie Carragher that Liverpool could effectively write off their chances of winning the league, saying, "We never give up. Cowards give up."

Riise made it into the list of the top 50 Liverpool appearance-makers of all time when he played in the 5–0 victory over Luton Town on 15 January 2008.

On 22 April 2008, in Liverpool's Champions League semi-final first leg against Chelsea at Anfield, Riise scored an own goal in the 95th minute to equalise. Liverpool went on to lose 3–2 after extra time in the away match and were eliminated from the tournament 4–3 on aggregate.

Roma
Throughout the 2007–08 season, Riise's natural place in the side was often taken by Fábio Aurélio, the Brazilian establishing himself as the club's first choice left-back. On 18 June 2008, after being linked with moves to other English clubs, Riise signed a four-year contract with Italian Serie A club Roma. The club paid €5 million total (which could go up to €5.5 million), including €2.8 million per year. Riise soon became a fan favourite with his hard working spirit which drove Roma to several important victories. In fact, Riise's first goal for the club was against league leaders Internazionale in a pivotal top of the table game. Two months later, he scored again in the same stadium against Milan with a free kick into the top right corner, also providing an assist for Roma's second goal of the game. Riise was named the Man of the Match for the game, which ended 3–2 in favour of Roma. On 24 January 2010, Riise scored a late header three minutes into injury time in Roma's 2–1 away win over Juventus. He was also responsible for the dismissal of influential goalkeeper Gianluigi Buffon in the same game after making a terrific run leaving Buffon no choice but to foul the full-back. Given the nature of the game, it is seen as one of Riise's most memorable moments in a Roma jersey.

Fulham
On 13 July 2011, Fulham announced that Riise had signed a three-year-deal with the club for an undisclosed fee. Riise joined his brother, Bjørn Helge Riise, at Fulham who signed for the club in 2009. Riise made his Fulham debut on 21 July 2011, playing in the UEFA Europa League against Crusaders at Craven Cottage.

On 23 May 2014, he was released from the club at the end of his contract.

APOEL
On 1 September 2014, John Arne Riise signed a one-year contract, with the option of a further season with Cypriot side APOEL. He made his official debut on 20 September 2014, playing the full 90 minutes and providing two assists in APOEL's 3–1 away victory against Ayia Napa for the Cypriot First Division. He made his only 2014–15 UEFA Champions League group stage appearance with APOEL on 21 October 2014, coming on as a 41st-minute substitute in his team's 0–1 home defeat to Paris Saint-Germain. He scored his first official goal for APOEL on 11 January 2015, opening the scoreline in his team's 1–2 defeat at AEL Limassol for the Cypriot First Division. On 20 May 2015, Riise played a key role in APOEL's 4–2 win over AEL in the final of the Cypriot Cup, scoring his side's decisive fourth goal with a trademark blistering 30-metre free-kick and lifted his first trophy with APOEL in Cyprus. On 24 May 2015, APOEL secured their third consecutive Cypriot league title after beating Ermis Aradippou 4–2, and Riise celebrated the second championship trophy of his career, 15 years after winning the French league with Monaco. On 25 May 2015, one day after winning the double with APOEL, the team announced that Riise's contract was terminated by mutual consent.

Delhi Dynamos
On 24 August 2015, Indian Super League side Delhi Dynamos confirmed the signing of Riise for the upcoming 2015 tournament.

Aalesund
On 11 March 2016, Riise announced on his Twitter page that he had signed for Aalesunds FK, marking his return to the club at which he began his career. Not too long after signing the contract, Riise decided to take a break from professional football, stating a loss of motivation fuelled the decision. He stated that he would return to football before officially retiring.

Chennaiyin
On 18 August 2016, Riise returned from retirement to play for Indian Super League club Chennaiyin. on a two-month contract, as a marquee signing for the Indian club. Co-owner Vita Dani said that he was "delighted" at the signing, and praised Riise's "exceptional" experience as a player. He played ten matches for the club and also scored a goal in the season.

International career
Riise made his debut for the Norway national team against Iceland on 31 January 2000. His first international goals came against Turkey in a Friendly match on 23 February 2000, a game Norway won 2–0. Later that year, he made the only international tournament appearance of his career at UEFA Euro 2000, but was an unused substitute in all three of the team's Group C matches. Through the next decade, Riise was Norway's first-choice left-back, and on 12 November 2011, he played his 100th international match when Norway lost 4–1 against Wales. On 15 August 2012, Riise played his 104th match for Norway and equalled Thorbjørn Svenssen's record as the most capped Norwegian player, eventually surpassing it before retiring from international football in 2013.

Playing style
According to his profile on Fulham FC's website, Riise was "renowned for his unrivalled stamina and powerful shooting ... impressing both as an accomplished defender and as a marauding full-back." He also was a threat from set pieces. While primarily a left back, he often also played as a left midfielder whilst at Liverpool.

Post-playing career
On 4 January 2019, Riise joined Maltese club Birkirkara as a sports director but resigned after less than three months due to personal reasons.

On 5 November 2019, Riise was announced as the new manager of Norwegian Third Division club Flint Tønsberg. He left the club at the end of the 2021 season which ended with relegation to the Norwegian Fourth Division. On 8 December 2021, he was presented as the new manager of Toppserien club Avaldsnes on a two-year contract.

Personal life
Riise has a younger brother named Bjørn Helge Riise who was also a Norwegian international. The two both played for Fulham in the 2011–12 season.

Riise was married to his childhood sweetheart, the Norwegian model Guri Havnevik, from 2003 until they divorced in 2004. He has one daughter with Guri named Ariana, born in January 2001. He has Ariana's name tattooed on his right arm.

Riise got engaged to Maria Elvegard in 2007. The couple were due to be married in the summer of 2008 but had to postpone the day after moving to Rome. They married on 21 June 2010 in a private ceremony in New York City, inviting only their family and close friends. Maria decided to have a double-barrelled surname, Elvegard-Riise. With Maria, he has one daughter named Emma born on 4 August 2009 and one son named Patrick born in November 2011. He has Emma's name and date of birth tattooed on his left arm. He also has Patrick's name tattooed on his left arm. In February 2012, they announced that they would divorce.

In May 2014, he married Louise Angelica.

Since retiring as a player Riise has been involved in various bankruptcies, either by him directly or by companies owned or managed by him. He was sued by his ex-wife for allegedly for removing funds illegally from an account belonging to their child. He also received publicized financial assistance from Silje Sandmæl, one of the main economists from the popular TV-show "Luksusfellen", which is a reality-like show that explores the hardships of people in helpless financial situations.

On the ninth of August 2019, his fourth child, Colin, was born with Louise Angelica Riise.

Career statistics

Club

International

Scores and results list Norway's goal tally first, score column indicates score after each Riise goal.

Honours
Monaco
 Division 1: 1999–2000
 Trophée des Champions: 2000

Liverpool
 FA Cup: 2005–06
 Football League Cup: 2002–03; runner-up 2004-05
 FA Community Shield: 2001, 2006; runner-up 2002
 UEFA Champions League: 2004–05; runner-up 2006-07
 UEFA Super Cup: 2001, 2005
FIFA Club World Championship runner-up: 2005

APOEL
 Cypriot First Division: 2014–15
 Cypriot Cup: 2014–15

Individual
 Kniksen of the Year: 2006

See also
 List of men's footballers with 100 or more international caps

References

External links

 
 
 
 
 
 Thisisanfield.com player profile
 LFChistory.net player profile

1980 births
Living people
Sportspeople from Ålesund
Sportspeople from Tønsberg
Norwegian footballers
Association football fullbacks
Association football wingers
Aalesunds FK players
AS Monaco FC players
Liverpool F.C. players
A.S. Roma players
Fulham F.C. players
APOEL FC players
Odisha FC players
Chennaiyin FC players
SK Rollon players
Norwegian First Division players
Ligue 1 players
Premier League players
Serie A players
Cypriot First Division players
Indian Super League players
Eliteserien players
UEFA Champions League winning players
Kniksen Award winners
Norway youth international footballers
Norway under-21 international footballers
Norway international footballers
UEFA Euro 2000 players
FIFA Century Club
Norwegian expatriate footballers
Norwegian expatriate sportspeople in Monaco
Norwegian expatriate sportspeople in England
Norwegian expatriate sportspeople in Italy
Norwegian expatriate sportspeople in Cyprus
Norwegian expatriate sportspeople in India
Norwegian expatriate sportspeople in Malta
Expatriate footballers in Monaco
Expatriate footballers in England
Expatriate footballers in Italy
Expatriate footballers in Cyprus
Expatriate footballers in India
FA Cup Final players
Norwegian football managers
Avaldsnes IL managers